Morning Exercises refers to a religious observance by Puritans in London which started at the beginning of the English Civil War.

Origins
As most of the citizens of London had either a near relation or friend in the army of the Earl of Essex, clergymen were getting overwhelmed with requests to include prayers for these soldiers in their Sunday services. So a group of them agreed to set aside an hour at 7 am, every morning, with half an hour for prayer and half an hour for a broader exhortation of the population. It was started by Thomas Case the Presbyterian minister at St. Mary Magdalen, Milk Street and continued there for a month. The exercises were then taken up by other churches across the City of London. Shortly after Westminster Abbey also started to host religious lectures between 6  - 8am, not only for local residents, but also for Members of Parliament. The preachers here included Edmund Staunton, Philip Nye, Stephen Marshall, Herbert Palmer, Charles Herle, Jeremiah Whitaker and Thomas Hill.

At Cripplegate
After the Civil War the Morning Exercises were continued, with many collected by Samuel Annesley being subsequently published in six volumes.

Preachers published by Annesley
The following list of 75 was published in 1844.

References

Puritanism in England